Chornomorsk, formerly Illichivsk (translit. Illichivs'k), is a city in Odesa Raion, Odesa Oblast (province) of south-western Ukraine, dependent on the Port of Chornomorsk. The city is located around the Sukhyi Estuary. Population:  

Originally, the city was established as a satellite town of Odesa.

Geography 

History 

Before the construction of a port with a city, the region was the site of a number of unorganized farmsteads and hamlets (khutir) that were collectively known as Buhovi khutory that were located on agricultural lots of a local landowner Andriy Buhovyi.  After establishing of the Soviet regime and "nationalization" and collectivization of the area, in 1927 the settlement was renamed into Illichivskyi Khutir.

In 1952 a port was established, and its surrounding territory was urbanized and converted into a city of Illichivsk. The city was designed to become a new home for the Black Sea Shipping Company (then the largest passenger and commercial vessel operator in the world). Originally a builder's trailer village, Chornomorsk has expanded to become Ukraine's most prosperous town by income per capita. Residents are mostly employed by the port (one of the largest ports of Europe) and the maritime industry. Residents of Odesa have recently begun relocating to lower-cost but higher-income Chornomorsk.

On 15 May 2015 President of Ukraine Petro Poroshenko signed a bill into law which began a six months period for the removal of communist monuments and the mandatory renaming of settlements with names related to Communism. On 12 November 2015, the City Council decided to rename the city to Chornomorsk (after the Black Sea coast upon which the city is found). The decision was confirmed by the Verkhovna Rada (the Ukrainian parliament) on 4 February 2016. The city was originally named after Vladimir Lenin, the founder of the Soviet Union.

Demographics
According to the 2001 Ukrainian Census:

Economy

Train ferry service to Bulgaria 

Chornomorsk was connected by freight train ferry line (426 km) to Varna in Bulgaria in 1978. Four train ferries two Soviet and two Bulgarian ones, named "Hero of Odesa", "Hero of Sevastopol" and "Hero of Schipka", "Hero of Pleven" which could take in three decks a total of 108 two bogie (four axle) Soviet freight cars. In the first ten-year period (1978–1988), these train ferries had transported 1,000,000 freight cars between Illichivsk and Varna. This train ferry service took 17 hours in both directions. The Bulgarians built break of gauge apparatus at Varna which made it possible to change bogies of 24 freight cars in one hour thirty minutes.

Industries 

Chornomorsk's economy is largely oriented to the sea. The biggest employer is the Port of Chornomorsk. The headquarters and manufacturing facilities of "Antarctica" (Ukraine's largest fishing company) are located in the city, and other major maritime shipping companies have also chosen to open their offices there.

The city also has a freight railway station. The port is on one of the freight routes of China's proposed Eurasian Land Bridge (part of the "New Silk Road"), which would see an eastern link to China via ferry to Georgia, Azerbaijan and across the Caspian Sea, and a western link by train to western Europe.

International relations

Twin towns – Sister cities 
Chornomorsk is twinned with:

  Narva, Estonia
  Beyoğlu, Istanbul, Turkey
  Maardu, Estonia
  Qaradağ raion, Baku, Azerbaijan
  Tczew, Poland
 Poti, Georgia

References

External links
 

 
Cities in Odesa Oblast
Populated places established in the Ukrainian Soviet Socialist Republic
Port cities and towns in Ukraine
Port cities of the Black Sea
City name changes in Ukraine
Former Soviet toponymy in Ukraine
Cities in Odesa Raion